Astreopora incrustans, commonly known as starflower coral, is a species of hard coral found in the central Indo-Pacific, Japan and the East China Sea, the Solomons, Eastern Australia, and the Philippines. It is uncommon throughout its range.

References

Acroporidae
Cnidarians of the Indian Ocean
Cnidarians of the Pacific Ocean
Marine fauna of Oceania
Corals described in 1896